Eleanor Vere Boyle (1825–1916) was an artist of the Victorian era whose work consisted mainly of watercolor illustrations in children’s books. These illustrations were strongly influenced by the Pre-Raphaelites, being highly detailed and haunting in content. Love and death were popular subject matter of Pre-Raphaelite art and something that can be seen in Eleanor Vere Boyle’s work. Dante Gabriel Rossetti, the founder of the Pre-Raphaelite Brotherhood, even called her work "great in design." However, even though she was one of the first woman artists to be recognized for her achievements, she did not exhibit or sell work often as it was not acceptable given her family’s social status. Thus, she signed her works “EVB” to obscure her identity and quickly became one of the most important female illustrators in the 1860s.

Biography 

Eleanor Vere Boyle was born in Scotland on 1 May 1825 to Alexander Gordon of Ellon Castle, Aberdeenshire, descendant of the Duke of Ancaster. She was raised as the youngest of eight children in the Scottish hills above the River Dee. She later moved to England and married Richard Boyle, son of the Earl of Cork and chaplain to Queen Victoria.

Eleanor Vere Boyle’s fascination of nature strongly influenced her later work, which primarily consisted of garden books after her husband died. However, during her lifetime, up until she died in 1916, she produced, and was highly acclaimed for, work for children’s books. Totaled up, Eleanor had written or illustrated twenty-one books in about a fifty-year time-span. All these works were inspired by many things in which Eleanor was fascinated: nature, but also fate, dreams and flowing water.

Principal works 
Her fascinations and their influence were clear in her illustrations she created for the poet Tennyson's May Queen in 1852. Such fascinations were even more evident in her illustrations for Hans Christian Andersen’s fairy tales in 1872, which was one of the earliest editions illustrated by an English person. It included twelve full color images and many other line drawings. Andersen had a definite dark side to many of his stories. With Eleanor’s ability to translate it into visual form with her own slightly sinister taste, this edition was made to be one of the most cohesive between illustration and writing. This cohesiveness set a new standard for the future illustration in Hans Andersen’s work. Some of the most highly acclaimed illustrations from this book include: "The Snow Queen," The Wild Swans," "The Ugly Duckling," "The Little Mermaid," "Thumbkinetta," "The Garden of Paradise," "The Fellow Traveller" (which inspired Tolkien's The Hobbit) and "The Angel."

Three years later, Eleanor Vere Boyle created what is considered one of her greatest works. In 1875, Eleanor created a retelling and illustration of the well-known story Beauty and the Beast. This work includes ten full color images. She is praised most for her unique take on the Beast. While this story has been illustrated many times, Eleanor Vere Boyle’s version seems to be the first and only to be reminiscent of a sea-creature with walrus-like tusks and flippers. This is highly different from the usual humanistic portrayal. Eleanor veers away from all normalities of the character, lacking an upright position, human facial features and clothes.

Other notable works by Eleanor Vere Boyle are her illustrations in The Story Without an End and Child’s Play, as well as her illustrations and writings in Ros Rosarum Ex Horto Poetarum (1885). The Story Without an End is originally a German story by Friedrich Wilhelm Carove. It was later translated by Sarah Austin to English, and illustrated by Eleanor. On the other hand, Child’s Play and Ros Rasarum Ex Horto Poetarum were books by Eleanor herself. In Child’s Play, she matched famous nursery rhymes with her illustrations, and in Ros Rosarum Ex Horto Poetarum, Eleanor wrote poetry and created illustrations to accompany the writings. Ros Rosarum Ex Horto Poetarum is translated to "Dew of the Ever-living Rose, Gathered from the Poets' Gardens of Many Lands" in English. It is one of the most highly acclaimed works by scholars and claimed to be culturally important. Being preserved as a historic artifact, it is open to the public domain in the United States and available to read here.

Ros Rosarum Ex Horto Poetarum is not where Eleanor Vere Boyle stopped writing either. Near the end of her career, Eleanor Vere Boyle continued to write, the content focused on nature as she wrote and illustrated garden books. In the last thirty-two years of her life, she wrote and illustrated four: Days and Hours in a Garden (1884), A Garden of Pleasure (1895), Seven Gardens and a Palace (1900), and Garden Colour (1905). The last work released by Eleanor was eight years prior to her death: The Peacocks Pleasaunce (1908), which was a collection of twelve beautiful writings she created, (also known as, belles-lettres) accompanied by eight illustrations.

Other works
 A Child's Summer (1853)
 In the Fir-Wood (1866)
 A New Child's Play (1877)
 A London Sparrow at the Colinderies (1887)
 A Midsummer-Night Dream (1887)
 Sylvana's Letters to an Unknown Friend (1900)

References

External links
 EVB illustrations
 EVB oil paintings

1825 births
1916 deaths
19th-century Scottish painters
19th-century Scottish women artists
19th-century Scottish women writers
20th-century Scottish painters
20th-century Scottish women artists
20th-century Scottish women writers
British children's book illustrators
British women illustrators
People from Aberdeenshire
Scottish women painters